Morris Joseph Curotta (24 March 1929 – 28 October 2002) was an Australian track and field athlete. In the 1948 Summer Olympics he competed in the 100 metres, 400 metres and 4 × 100 metres relay. In the 1952 Summer Olympics he competed in the 400 metres, 4 × 100 metres relay and 4 × 400 metres relay.

Competition record

References
Sports Reference

1929 births
2002 deaths
Australian male sprinters
Olympic athletes of Australia
Athletes (track and field) at the 1948 Summer Olympics
Athletes (track and field) at the 1952 Summer Olympics